Bolsover is a market town and the administrative centre of the Bolsover District, Derbyshire, England. It is the main town in the Bolsover district.

The civil parish for the town is called Old Bolsover. It includes the town and the New Bolsover model village, along with Hillstown, Carr Vale,
Shuttlewood, Stanfree, Oxcroft, and Whaley. Its population at the 2011 UK Census was 11,673.

Bolsover, along with several nearby villages, is situated in the north-east of the county of Derbyshire. It is the main town in the District of Bolsover, which is an electoral constituency and part of Derbyshire.

Bolsover sought city status in the Platinum Jubilee Civic Honours, but the bid was unsuccessful.

History

The origin of the name is uncertain. It may be derived from Bula's Ofer or Boll's Ofer, respectively the Old English for Bull's Ridge and Boll's Ridge (the ridge associated with a person named Boll); in the 1650s it was referred to as 'Bolsouer'.

Bolsover is mentioned in Domesday Book, named as Belesovre, where it is described as the property of William Peverel (or "Peveril"). The description refers to the villans, the ploughs, eight acres (32,000 m2) of meadow and woodland pasture, which is given as two leagues by a league.  Bolsover became the seat of the Peverel family, and in the 12th century a keep was built. The present castle was erected in 1613.

In 1657 the leading Royalist William Cavendish, 1st Marquess of Newcastle, published his book La Methode et Invention nouvelle de dresser les Chevaux, written in exile in Antwerp during the Cromwellian Protectorate. This was translated in 1743 to A General System of Horsemanship in All its Branches. It covered the dressage of horses, at his 'Bolsouer', Welbeck Abbey, and Antwerp stables and contains engravings attributed to Abraham van Diepenbeeck showing Newcastle on a horse ('Monsieur le Marquis a Cheval') and views of his estates, including Bolsover.

The district of Bolsover is notable for three sites of historical importance: Bolsover Castle, Creswell Crags (home to Britain's only known Palaeolithic cave art) and Creswell Model Village, an example of early twentieth century design from the model village movement.

Two railway lines once served Bolsover, but both were early casualties. The Midland Railway (later part of the London, Midland & Scottish Railway), arrived first with their north-south running Doe Lea line from Staveley to Pleasley, opened in September 1890 and thus enabling a through service between Chesterfield and Mansfield to be operated, but services were withdrawn as early as September 1930. Bolsover Castle station served the town.

The other line was the highly ambitious west–east running Lancashire, Derbyshire and East Coast Railway, later part of the Great Central Railway and subsequently the London & North Eastern Railway. Only the middle section from Chesterfield to Lincoln was ever built, opening in March 1897 (the Bolsover station was Bolsover South), but the section between Chesterfield and Shirebrook was brought to a premature demise in December 1951 by the deteriorating state of its biggest engineering feature, the 2,624-yard (2,399-metre) Bolsover Tunnel which ran beneath the limestone ridge on which stands the castle. The tunnel was mostly filled in with colliery waste in 1966–67, and both ends sealed off. Today both portals are visible, the eastern portal at the end of an unusually deep sheer-sided cutting in the village of Scarcliffe and the western portal just to the south east side of Bolsover.

In chronostratigraphy, the British sub-stage (formerly 'stage') of the Carboniferous period, the 'Bolsovian' derives its name from a geological exposure at the River Doe Lea, Bolsover.

Bolsover Hospital was completed in 1988 but closed in spring 2019.

Economy
The major industry of the area used to be coal mining, but this has declined throughout all of Britain. The two main collieries closed in 1993. Markham Colliery, west of the town, closed on 2 July 1993. Bolsover Colliery, one of the five mines owned by the Bolsover Colliery Company closed on 7 May 1993. The Bolsover Colliery Company was one of the companies in the original FT 30 list of companies. The other main employer was the Coalite and Chemical Company, which produced smokeless fuel and chemicals from coke and was founded in 1937, and moved its main headquarters from London to Bolsover in 1952. It was closed in 2004 after a decline in demand for solid fuel, which had left the company and its many subsidiaries deeply in debt. Its  production of chemicals used to produce Agent Orange in the Vietnam War and its environmental impact on surrounding communities of Duckmanton, Shuttlewood, New Bolsover and Bolsover itself had rendered it a controversial company.

Another significant local employer was The Bolsover Hosiery Company Ltd, which was established in 1951 by Bolsover Urban District Council. The main factory site on Oxcroft Lane employed approximately 500 people at its peak in the late 1990s. It underwent a succession of takeovers, eventually becoming part of Courtald's Textiles. The company was taken over by the Sara Lee conglomerate and the factory closed in 2000 with the loss of approximately 350 jobs.

Governance and politics

Bolsover has three levels of local government. The civil parish of Old Bolsover is administered by Old Bolsover Town Council. The parish falls within the wider Bolsover District, and other functions are exercised by Derbyshire County Council.

The town falls within the Bolsover parliamentary constituency. The MP for the constituency from 1970 until 2019 was the Labour Party's Dennis Skinner, a former miner. He lost his seat in the 2019 election to the Conservative Mark Fletcher.

Sport
Bolsover Colliery F.C. used to play in the FA Cup. Current club F.C. Bolsover, founded in 2013, played in the Northern Counties East Football League for the 2018/19 season.

Television
In 2007 Bolsover was chosen as the location to shoot the film Summer starring Robert Carlyle and Rachael Blake. Many scenes from the film were filmed on the Castle Estate, which is affectionately known by the Bolsover residents as the 'Wimps' (because it was built, in the 1950s, by George Wimpey, the construction company) and lies just underneath Bolsover Castle. Other parts of the film were filmed in Whitwell, Bramley Vale and Shirebrook Community school, just a few miles from Bolsover. Summer was released on 5 December 2008. The trailer for Summer was released in late November and contained a few scenes which showed the Castle Estate in Bolsover containing the top of Springfield Crescent and also Hyndley Road. In an interview in late November, director Kenneth Glenaan and Robert Carlyle agreed that Bolsover was the perfect setting for the film as it "has been left in the past". It also said that going from Matlock to Bolsover is like going to a different country and that the Castle Estate is "the land time forgot".

Notable people
 Steven Blakeley – actor
 Charlie Elliott MBE – English cricketer
 Peter Fidler – explorer, mapmaker, and surveyor of the Hudson's Bay Company
 Bill Leivers – ex-professional footballer
 Ross McMillan – professional rugby hooker for Coventry RFC
 Mark Morris – author
 Richard O'Dwyer – computer programmer, creator of TVShack.net, whom the United States sought to extradite over alleged copyright infringement
 Dennis Skinner – longstanding MP for Bolsover

See also 
The Bolsover School
List of places in Derbyshire
Bolsover Street, London
Listed buildings in Old Bolsover

References 

 
Towns in Derbyshire